The Islamic Emirate of Kunar was a short-lived unrecognized Salafi quasi-state in Kunar Province, which was led by Jamil al-Rahman and established by his group, Jamaat al-Dawah ila al-Quran wal-Sunnah. The Islamic Emirate of Kunar was the first modern Islamic state, and it had captured the attention of many Salafis from Arab nations, who ended up either sending money or coming to Afghanistan to join them.

History  
After the withdrawal of Soviet troops in 1988, Kunar Province fell entirely under mujahideen control. In the recently captured areas, armed groups committed many atrocities against the civilian population, and fought each other for supremacy over the province. Kunar, which had already suffered heavily during repeated Soviet offensives, was devastated by these clashes. Jamil al-Rahman and his Jamaat al Dawa al Quran forces, at the time made up of mostly Arab volunteers, also with support from many rich Saudi and Kuwaiti businessmen, managed to overpower all their rivals, until the only other remaining force in Kunar was Hezb-e Islami Gulbuddin, led by Gulbuddin Hekmatyar. In March 1990, the two groups agreed to form a joint Shura, but differences quickly reappeared, in particular over the question of the Gulf War. While Hekmatyar took an anti-American, anti-Saudi monarchy stance, Jamil al-Rahman chose to support his Saudi and Kuwaiti patrons. In January 1991 Jamil al-Rahman proclaimed the creation of the Islamic Emirate of Kunar with himself as the leader. He appointed ministers of Defense, Interior, Foreign Affairs, Justice, Information, Finance and Education. In accordance with his Salafi creed, Jamil al-Rahman tried to eradicate Afghan traditions which he considered un-Islamic, such as the use of flags over the graves of martyrs fallen in Jihad, and the building of monuments over the tombs of Pirs. In the spring of 1991 fighting resumed between Jamaat al Dawa al Quran and Hezb-e Islami Gulbuddin, which lost most of its bases in Kunar. This prompted Gulbuddin Hekmatyar to launch a counterattack with several hundred men, with the support of other mujahideen factions. On April 20, 1991, an explosion on Jamil al-Rahman's Asadabad headquarters, apparently the result of a Scud missile strike, killed many of Jamil al-Rahman's followers and he was overthrown by Hekmatyar. Local witnesses reported that the Salafists were massacred by Hekmatyar's men. Jamil al-Rahman was forced to flee to Pakistan.

See also  
 Islamic Emirate of Afghanistan (1996–2001)
 Islamic Emirate of Byara

References

1990s in Afghanistan
Former countries in Asia
Former emirates
Former theocracies
Former unrecognized countries
Rebellions in Asia
Emirates
States and territories established in 1991
States and territories disestablished in 1991
1991 establishments in Asia
1991 disestablishments in Asia
Lists of former countries
Former countries in South Asia